Novy Karachay (Cangı Qaraçay) is an urban locality (a settlement) in Karachayevsky District of the Karachay-Cherkess Republic, Russia. As of the 2010 Census, its population was 3,035.

History
It was established in 1909 and was originally called Vorontsovo-Karachayevsky. Urban-type settlement status was granted to it in 1958.

Administrative and municipal status
Within the framework of administrative divisions, the settlement of Novy Karachay is subordinated to Karachayevsky District. As a municipal division, Novy Karachay is incorporated within Karachayevsky Municipal District as Novo-Karachayevskoye Urban Settlement.

References

Notes

Sources

Urban-type settlements in the Karachay-Cherkess Republic